Frank or Francis Fay may refer to:
 Frank Fay (Irish actor) (1870–1931), co-founder of the Abbey Theatre
 Frank Fay (American actor) (1891–1961), known for playing Elwood P. Dowd in the play Harvey
 Francis B. Fay (1793–1876), U.S. Representative from Massachusetts
 Frank B. Fay (1821–1904), Massachusetts businessman and politician

See also 
Frances Faye (1912–1991), American cabaret singer (female)